Novo Nordisk A/S is a Danish multinational pharmaceutical company headquartered in Bagsværd, Denmark,  with production facilities in nine countries, and affiliates or offices in five countries. Novo Nordisk is controlled by majority shareholder Novo Holdings A/S which holds approximately 25% of its shares and a relative majority (45%) of its voting shares.

Novo Nordisk manufactures and markets pharmaceutical products and services, specifically diabetes care medications and devices. Novo Nordisk is also involved with hemostasis management, growth hormone therapy and hormone replacement therapy. The company makes several drugs under various brand names, including Levemir, Tresiba,  NovoLog, Novolin R, NovoSeven, NovoEight and Victoza.

Novo Nordisk employs more than 48,000 people globally, and markets its products in 168 countries. The corporation was created in 1989, through a merger of two Danish companies which date back to the 1920s. The Novo Nordisk logo is the Apis bull, one of the sacred animals of ancient Egypt.

Novo Nordisk is a full member of the European Federation of Pharmaceutical Industries and Associations (EFPIA).

The company was ranked 25th among 100 Best Companies to Work For in 2010, and 72nd in 2014 by Fortune. In January 2012, Novo Nordisk was named as the most sustainable company in the world by the business magazine Corporate Knights while spin-off company Novozymes was named fourth.

Novo Nordisk is the largest pharmaceutical company in Denmark.

History

1923 
Nordisk Insulinlaboratorium commercialises the production of insulin.

1986 
Novo Industri A/S acquired the Ferrosan Group, now named as "Novo Nordisk Pharmatech A/S".

1989 
Novo Industri A/S (Novo Terapeutisk Laboratorium) and Nordisk Gentofte A/S (Nordisk Insulinlaboratorium) merged to become Novo Nordisk A/S, the world's largest producer of insulin with headquarters in Bagsværd, Copenhagen.

1991 
Novo Nordisk Engineering (now NNE A/S) demerged after working as in-house consultants at Novo Nordisk for years, to provide standard engineering services (end to end engineering) to the pharma manufacturing companies.

1994 
Novo Nordisk's existing information technology units was spun out as NNIT A/S. The company was converted into a wholly owned aktieselskab in 2004 In March 2015, NNIT was floated on the NASDAQ OMX Nordic.

2000 
Novo's enzymes business, Novozymes A/S, was spun-out.

2013 
Novo acquired Xellia for $700 million.

2015 
The company announced it would collaborate with Ablynx, using its nanobody technology to develop at least one new drug candidate.

2018 
In January, Reuters reported that Novo had offered to acquire Ablynx for $3.1 billion - having made an unreported offer in mid-December for the company. However, the Ablynx board rejected this offer the same day, explaining that the price undervalued the business. Ultimately ,Novo lost out to Sanofi who bid $4.8 billion. Later, in the same year the company announced it would acquire Ziylo for around $800 million.

2020 
In March, Novo volunteers started testing samples for SARS-CoV-2 with RT-qPCR equipment in the ongoing coronavirus pandemic to increase available test capacity. In June, the business announced it would acquire AstraZeneca's spin-off Corvidia Therapeutics for an initial sum of $725 million (up to a performance-related maximum of $2.1 billion), boosting its presence in cardiovascular diseases. In November, the company announced it would acquire Emisphere Technologies for $1.8 billion, gaining control of a pill-based treatment for diabetes. In December, Novo announced it would acquire Emisphere Technologies for $1.35 billion.

2021 
In November, Novo announced it would acquire Dicerna Pharmaceuticals and its RNAi therapeutics, for $3.3 billion ($38.25 per share).

Toxicogenomics
Novo Nordisk is involved in government funded collaborative research projects with other industrial and governmental partners. One example in the area of non-clinical safety assessment is the InnoMed PredTox. The company is expanding its activities in joint research projects within the framework of the Innovative Medicines Initiative of European Federation of Pharmaceutical Industries and Associations and the European Commission.

Diabetic work

Novo Nordisk founded the World Diabetes foundation to save the lives of those affected by diabetes in developing countries and supported a UN (United Nations) resolution to fight diabetes, making diabetes is the only other disease along with HIV / AIDS to have a commitment to combat at a UN level.

Diabetic treatments account for 85% of Novo Nordisk’s business. Novo Nordisk works with doctors, nurses, and patients, to develop products for self-managing diabetes conditions. The DAWN (Diabetes Attitudes, Wishes and Needs) 2001 study was a global survey of the psychosocial aspects of living with diabetes. It involved over 5,000 people with diabetes and almost 4,000 care providers. This study was designed to identify barriers to optimal health and quality of life. A follow-up study completed in 2012 involved more than 15,000 people living with, or caring for, those with diabetes. In response to British findings, a National Action Plan (NAP) was developed, with a multidisciplinary steering committee, to support the delivery of individualised person-focused care in the United Kingdom. The NAP seeks to provide a holistic approach to a diabetic treatment for patients and their families.

The i3-diabetes programme is a collaboration between the King's Health Partners, one of only six Academic Health Sciences Centres (AHSCs) in England, and Novo Nordisk. The programme is a five-year collaboration designed to deliver personalised care that will lead to improved outcomes for people living with diabetes, and more efficient and effective ways of caring for people with diabetes.

Diabetic support advocacy

Novo Nordisk have sponsored the International Diabetes Federation's Unite for Diabetes campaign.

In March 2014, Novo Nordisk announced a partnership program entitled ‘Cities Changing Diabetes,’ which entails combating urban diabetes. Partnership includes University College London (UCL) and supported by Steno Diabetes Center, as well as a range of local partners including healthcare professionals, city authorities, urban planners, businesses, academics and community leaders.

A November 2014 newspaper article, suggested that a recent medical research breakthrough at Harvard University (creating insulin-producing cells from embryonic stem cells) could potentially put Novo Nordisk out of business.  Dr Alan Moses, the chief medical officer of Novo Nordisk, commented that the biology of diabetes is incredibly complex, but also that Novo Nordisk's mission is to alleviate and cure diabetes.  If this new medical advance "...meant the dissolution of Novo Nordisk, that'd be fine."

Research and pipeline

Novo Nordisk was researching pulmonary delivery systems for diabetic medications, and in the early stages of research into autoimmune and chronic inflammatory diseases, using technologies such as translational immunology and monoclonal antibodies  In September 2014, the company announced a decision to discontinue all research in inflammatory disorders, including the discontinuation of R&D in anti-IL-20 for the treatment of rheumatoid arthritis.

In September 2018, it was reported that the company would lay off 400 administrative staff, laboratory technicians and scientists, in Denmark and China in order to concentrate  research and development efforts on “transformational biological and technological innovation”.

Controversies
In 2010, Novo Nordisk breached the code of conduct for Association of the British Pharmaceutical Industry, by failing to provide information about side-effects of Victoza and by promoting Victoza prior to being granted market authorisation.

In 2013, Novo Nordisk had to pay back DKK 3.6 billion to the Danish tax authorities due to transfer mispricing.

In March 2013, a debate emerged in which scientists questioned whether the incretin class of diabetic medications – the class to which Victoza belongs – had an increased risk of side effects in the pancreas such as pancreatitis and pancreatic cancer. It was concluded that data currently available did not confirm these concerns.

In October 2013, batches of NovoMix 30 FlexPen and Penfill insulin were recalled in some European countries as their analysis had shown that a small percentage of the products in these batches did not meet the specifications for insulin strength.

In September 2017, Novo Nordisk agreed to pay $58.7 million to end a United States Department of Justice probe into the lack of FDA disclosure to doctors about the cancer risk for their diabetic drug, Victoza.

Sponsorships and pitchpeople

Novo Nordisk has sponsored athletes with diabetes, such as Charlie Kimball in auto racing and Team Novo Nordisk in road cycling.

In the 2020s, black-ish actor Anthony Anderson served as a pitchman for Novo Nordisk, but featured in the company's television advert and aired in America.

See also
 Captain Novolin
 NNIT (formerly Novo Nordisk IT)
 Novo Nordisk Foundation
 Novo Nordisk Foundation Center for Protein Research
 Repaglinide
 Team Novo Nordisk

References

External links
 
 Novo Nordisk Inc
 Novo Nordisk Pharmatech A/S

1923 establishments in Denmark
Biotechnology companies of Denmark
Companies based in Gladsaxe Municipality
Companies listed on Nasdaq Copenhagen
Companies listed on the New York Stock Exchange
Danish brands
Danish companies established in 1923
Health care companies of Denmark
Life science companies based in Copenhagen
Life sciences industry
Orphan drug companies
Pharmaceutical companies established in 1923
Pharmaceutical companies of Denmark